Akim Oda Sunderland Football Academy is a Ghanaian association football club and academy based in Akim Oda, Ghana. They are competing in the GAFCOA.

Satellite clubs

 Asante Kotoko
 Sunderland F.C.

Notes

Football clubs in Ghana
2010 establishments in Ghana